Kim Min-woo (born 25 February 1990) is a South Korean football player who is currently playing for Chengdu Rongcheng.

Club career

Early career
Kim attended Yonsei University in Seoul. When he was a member of Yonsei University, he scored 3 goals in 2009 FIFA U-20 World Cup as a member of South Korea under 20 team and team achieved quarterfinals. Encouraged by his great plays in U-20 World Cup, he made trials in PSV Eindhoven, but failed to pass the trials. The trials were conducted without the knowledge of Yonsei University and he was expelled from university football team.

Sagan Tosu
Unable to continue his career in Korea following the PSV episode, Kim was recruited by compatriot Yoon Jung-Hwan to join J. League Division 2 side Sagan Tosu. Kim signed a three-year contract with Sagan Tosu.

International career
He was member of South Korea U-20 team in 2009 FIFA U-20 World Cup. Kim was called up to the South Korea squad for friendly match against Nigeria for the first time in 2010

In May 2018 he was named in South Korea's preliminary 28 man squad for the 2018 FIFA World Cup in Russia.

Career statistics

Club
Updated to 8 January 2023.

International goals
 Results list South Korea's goal tally first.

Honours

International
South Korea
EAFF East Asian Cup: 2015, 2017

Club
Suwon Samsung Bluewings
Korean FA Cup: 2019

References

External links
Profile at Sagan Tosu
Kim Min-woo – National Team stats at KFA 

 

1990 births
Living people
People from Jinju
South Korean footballers
Association football midfielders
South Korea under-17 international footballers
South Korea under-20 international footballers
South Korea under-23 international footballers
South Korea international footballers
South Korean expatriate footballers
J1 League players
J2 League players
Sagan Tosu players
K League 1 players
Suwon Samsung Bluewings players
Gimcheon Sangmu FC players
Expatriate footballers in Japan
South Korean expatriate sportspeople in Japan
Yonsei University alumni
2015 AFC Asian Cup players
Asian Games medalists in football
Footballers at the 2010 Asian Games
Asian Games bronze medalists for South Korea
Medalists at the 2010 Asian Games
2018 FIFA World Cup players
Sportspeople from South Gyeongsang Province